The Good Son is a 1982 novel by Craig Nova.

John Irving in The New York Times wrote that it was the highest quality of the author's novels and "the richest and most expert novel in my recent reading by any writer now under 40."

References

External links
 The Good Son Reader’s Guide - Penguin Random House

1982 novels
Delacorte Press books